Miss World Spain 2016 was the 4th edition of the Miss World Spain pageant, held on September 17, 2016. The winner was Raquel Tejedor Melendez of Aragón and she represented Spain in Miss World 2016. This was the last edition of Miss World Spain under the Be Miss Organization. Later in the year, they give up the license to focus solely on Miss Universe Spain. The license then went to Nuestra Belleza España.

Final results

Official Delegates

Notes

Returns
Last competed in 2011:
 Navarre

Last competed in 2014:
 Aragón
 Galicia
 Madrid

Withdrawals
 Alicante
 Extremadura

Did not compete
 Albacete
 Almería
 Araba
 Ávila
 Badajoz
 Burgos
 Cáceres
 Canary Islands
 Cantabria
 Ceuta
 Ciudad Real
 Córdoba
 Cuenca
 Granada
 Guadalajara
 Guipúzcoa
 Huesca
 La Coruña
 León
 Lugo
 Orense
 Pontevedra
 Salamanca
 Segovia
 Soria
 Teruel
 Toledo
 Valladolid
 Vizcaya
 Zamora
 Zaragoza

References

External links

Miss Spain
2016 in Spain
2016 beauty pageants